The Bottle District is a six-block, 17-acre area north of Downtown St. Louis, Missouri, that is being redeveloped as a mixed-use entertainment and residential district.  It sits north of the city's convention center and west of Laclede's Landing.

The area is part of the old Kerry Patch neighborhood, which was home to thousands of Irish immigrants in the 19th century.  The neighborhood gradually became more industrial and was noted in the 1920s for its animal stockyards and bottling companies.

In 2004, longtime neighborhood business McGuire Moving and Storage Company, announced plans to redevelop the district as an entertainment destination.  Noted architect Daniel Libeskind was hired to design the district.  The Ghazi Company of Charlotte, North Carolina is the co-developer.

A groundbreaking ceremony was held on September 27, 2005, with plans for the first phase to open in 2007. The plans called for a Rawlings Sports museum, a Grand Prix Speedways kart-racing center, a boutique bowling alley, 250 residential units, and several restaurants.  The first phase of the development was anticipated to cost $290 million, to be funded in part by $51.3 million in tax increment financing.

But that effort stalled. In late 2011, the St. Louis Board of Aldermen approved the transfer of the unused $51.3 million to a new developer, NorthSide Regeneration LLC. The deal would see the previous investment group, including developers Larry Chapman and Clayco, sell the site to NorthSide for an undisclosed amount that documents with the city suggest would be $3 million; all three were to work to find tenants and build on the site. Construction on a $190 million office and residential project was to begin in summer 2012.

Several explanations for the name of the Bottle District have been given.  It has been suggested that the name honors the longstanding connection between St. Louis and the brewing and bottling industries.  Others have suggested that the name comes from bottles found buried on the property, or the many broken bottles found in the neighborhood.  Finally, the site is noted for a decades-old,  advertisement for Vess Soda, shaped like a bottle, which the developers intend to restore during the redevelopment. Location: 520 O'Fallon St.

See also
 Vess

External links 
 For St. Louis, Great Expectations but a Slow-Rolling Renaissance (New York Times)
 The Movers Are Here. Have You Done Your Homework? - 2007 The New York Times
 Image of Giant Vess Soda Bottle

Notes

Economy of St. Louis
Neighborhoods in St. Louis
Warehouse districts of the United States